Dunfermline is a village in Fulton County, Illinois, United States. The population was 300 at the 2010 census, up from 262 at the 2000 census. Dunfermline is pronounced Done-ferm-lin.

History
A post office has been in operation at Dunfermline since 1887. A share of the first settlers being natives of Dunfermline, Scotland, caused the name to be selected.

Geography
Dunfermline is located in east-central Fulton County at  (40.491767, -90.031282). Illinois Route 78 forms the eastern border of the village; the highway leads north  to Canton and south  to U.S. Route 24 at Little America.

Demographics

As of the census of 2000, there were 262 people, 106 households, and 80 families residing in the village. The racial makeup of the village was 95.04% White, 2.29% Native American, and 2.67% from two or more races.

There were 106 households, out of which 31.1% had children under the age of 18 living with them, 63.2% were married couples living together, 11.3% had a female householder with no husband present, and 24.5% were non-families. 20.8% of all households were made up of individuals, and 11.3% had someone living alone who was 65 years of age or older.  The average household size was 2.47 and the average family size was 2.85.

In the village, the population was spread out, with 24.0% under the age of 18, 9.5% from 18 to 24, 27.1% from 25 to 44, 23.3% from 45 to 64, and 16.0% who were 65 years of age or older.  The median age was 37 years. For every 100 females, there were 101.5 males.  For every 100 females age 18 and over, there were 82.6 males.

The median income for a household in the village was $35,357, and the median income for a family was $41,250. Males had a median income of $22,222 versus $20,000 for females. The per capita income for the village was $16,152.  About 4.7% of families and 9.5% of the population were below the poverty line, including 11.8% of those under the age of eighteen and 11.6% of those 65 or over.

References

Villages in Fulton County, Illinois
Villages in Illinois
1887 establishments in Illinois